The Hilton Hanoi Opera Hotel is a hotel located in central Hanoi in the historic French Quarter. It opened in 1999. The World Travel Awards deemed it Vietnam’s Leading Hotel for five consecutive years from 2004 to 2008. It features accommodations such as an outdoor swimming pool with view of the Opera House, gym, spa and sauna, Vietnamese cuisine, cabaret jazz music, ballroom, and function rooms. The hotel closed on December 1, 2022 for major renovations. It will reopen in 2025 as the Waldorf Astoria Hanoi.

"Hanoi Hilton'"
The nearby Hỏa Lò Prison was a Vietnamese prisoner of war camp morbidly called the "Hanoi Hilton" by Americans captured during the Vietnam War. The camp held American soldiers from 1964 until 1973.

References

External links

Hotels in Hanoi
Hotels established in 1999
Hotel buildings completed in 1999
Hanoi
1999 establishments in Vietnam